Silic (1995–2013) is a French Thoroughbred racehorse who competed both in France and in the United States. His most notable win came in the 1999 Breeders' Cup Mile.

Retired after the 2000 racing season, Silic stood at stud at Crestwood Farm in Lexington, Kentucky then for 2007 was sent to Getaway Thoroughbred Farm in Romoland, California.

References
 Silic's pedigree and racing stats retrieved Nov. 26 2006

1995 racehorse births
2013 racehorse deaths
Thoroughbred family 1-l
Racehorses bred in France
Racehorses trained in France
Racehorses trained in the United States
Breeders' Cup Mile winners